The Nemda is a river in Mari El and Kirov Oblast in Russia, a right tributary of the Pizhma. The length of the river is 162 km, the area of its basin is 3,780 km². The Nemda freezes up in mid-November and remains icebound until mid-April.

References

Rivers of Mari El
Rivers of Kirov Oblast